The 2010–11 Youngstown State Penguins men's basketball team represented Youngstown State University in the 2010–11 NCAA Division I men's basketball season. Their head coach was Jerry Slocum. The Penguins played their home games at the Beeghly Center and were members of the Horizon League. They finished the season 9–21, 2–16 in Horizon League play and lost in the first round of the 2011 Horizon League men's basketball tournament to Valparaiso.

Roster

Schedule

|-
!colspan=9 style=| Regular season

|-
!colspan=9 style=| Horizon League tournament

References

Youngstown State Penguins
Youngstown State Penguins men's basketball seasons
2010 in sports in Ohio
2011 in sports in Ohio